Football Australia was a rebel organisation for the sport of Soccer in Australia and operated without any international affiliates. It was founded in 2012 by Australian business man Clive Palmer after having his Gold Coast United A-League licence revoked by the FFA. Archie Fraser was the most recent Chairman of Football Australia and Clive Palmer was President. Football Australia's last public activity was in June 2012 and the organisation is presumed to be defunct.

History
On 1 March 2012 Football Australia was launched by Australian mining magnate Clive Palmer with the slogan "We Kick Harder". It was originally announced that it was intended that the new federation would form a breakaway league and eventually replace the FFA and oversee football at a grassroots level and senior level. However, Palmer and FA's newly appointed chief executive, former A-League chief Archie Fraser, said the organisation was not necessarily out to topple the FFA but would act as watchdog and forum for ideas in the sport. It planned to publish papers, hold press conferences, seek opinions, lobby the government, lobby the FFA for a better outcome for Australians and the game in Australia.

Soon after the announcement many A-League club published statements rubbishing Palmer's new venture. Melbourne Heart CEO Scott Munn stated "Our position is clear - we've signed a clubs participation agreement to enter the A-League run and operated by Football Federation Australia" while Perth Glory owner Tony Sage declined to comment after previously supporting Clive Palmer. Sources from Sydney FC and Brisbane Roar also confirmed their intention of staying with the FFA.

It was also reported that Palmer tried to persuade a number of young Gold Coast United players to defect and sign contracts with a proposed rebel competition; however, a number of senior players intervened.

On 2 March 2012 both the AFC and FIFA publicly released a statement supporting Football Federation Australia saying that FIFA will only recognise one governing body in each FIFA affiliated nation and went on to say that "FIFA will continue its close cooperation with the FFA, however, we will also continue to monitor the situation".

On 13 March 2012 the federation launched a national commission of inquiry designed to hear submissions on ways to improve the sport’s administration and development. It was announced that the federation will hold hearings in Townsville, Newcastle, Canberra, Sydney, Melbourne, Hobart, Adelaide and Perth. The hearings are to be conducted by former president of FFSA Gary Collis with former Gold Coast United footballer Steve Fitzsimmons appointed secretary to the commission. A limited release of the inquiry occurred on 2 June 2012 but since then Football Australia has become inactive. The organisation's Twitter account was last active in June 2012 and the group's website domain name has not been re-registered.

See also
Soccer in Australia
Football Federation Australia

References

Soccer governing bodies in Australia
Sports organizations established in 2012
2012 establishments in Australia